The 15th anniversary of the pageant, Miss Chinese International Pageant 2003 was held on January 25, 2003 in Hong Kong.  TVB of Hong Kong broadcast and distributed the pageant worldwide. In the end, Miss Chinese International 2002 Shirley Zhou of Vancouver, British Columbia, Canada crowned Rachel Tan of Kuala Lumpur, Malaysia as the new winner.

Pageant information
The theme to this year's pageant is "Snow Reflects Beauty in Different Colours, Chinese Beauty of Fifteen Years" 「雪映佳人放異彩  華裔艷倩十五年」.  The Masters of Ceremonies include Priscilla Ku, Sonjia Kwok, Cutie Mui, and Louis Yuen.  Special performing guests were cantopop singer Kelly Chen, Miss Chinese International 1999, Michelle Ye and Miss Chinese International 2000 Sonjia Kwok.

Results

Special awards
Miss Friendship: Lola Gong 龔弦君 (Amsterdam)
Miss Snow Vitality: Grace Lee 李景熙 (Manila)

Contestant list

External links
 Miss Chinese International Pageant 2003 Official Site

TVB
2003 beauty pageants
2003 in Hong Kong
Beauty pageants in Hong Kong
Miss Chinese International Pageants